Gibbons Pass (el. 2117 m./6945 ft.) is a high mountain pass in the Rocky Mountains in Montana. It is situated on the North American Continental Divide. It was used by part of the Lewis and Clark Expedition on their return trip. Gibbons Pass is also one of the most historic passes in Montana. Its highest point is 6,945 feet above sea level.  The conflict with the Nez Perce Indians by Captain Gibbons began here. The pass was the main route for Indians, explorers, hunters and other traffic prior to the construction of US Highway 93.

See also
 Mountain passes in Montana

References

Bibliography
 
 Url

 
USGS Geographic Names Information System

Landforms of Beaverhead County, Montana
Mountain passes of Montana
Landforms of Ravalli County, Montana